Snook's Arm is a designated place in the Canadian province of Newfoundland and Labrador. The community was entirely resettled in 2018.

Geography 
Snook's Arm is in Newfoundland within Subdivision O of Division No. 8.

Demographics 

See also 
Baie Verte Peninsula
List of designated places in Newfoundland and Labrador
Resettlement (Newfoundland)

References 

Designated places in Newfoundland and Labrador